The 2006 Scheldeprijs was the 94th edition of the Scheldeprijs road cycling one day race, held on 12 April 2006 as part of the 2005–06 UCI Europe Tour, as a 1.HC categorised race.

Belgian rider Tom Boonen, in the rainbow jersey as the incumbent world champion, won the race in a bunch sprint for the  team, ahead of teammate Steven de Jongh, while compatriot Gert Steegmans completed the podium. Boonen was the first incumbent world champion to win the race since Eddy Merckx in 1972.

Teams
Twenty-one teams were invited to take part in the race.

Result

References

2006
2006 in road cycling
2006 in Belgian sport